Baricheh (also Romanized as Barīcheh, Bereycheh, and Berīcheh; also known as Barīsheh and Berijeh) is a village in Muran Rural District, in the Soveyseh District of Karun County, Khuzestan Province, Iran. At the 2006 census, its population was 270, in 60 families.

References 

Populated places in Karun County